TSS Sir Richard Grenville was a passenger tender vessel built for the Great Western Railway in 1891.

History

TSS Sir Richard Grenville was built by Cammell Laird and launched in 1891. She left the Mersey on 30 April 1891. She was intended as a tender to meet the large mail steamers frequenting Plymouth, and also as an excursion steamer along the coast.

She was advertised for sale in 1921 but was eventually returned to service until sold in 1931, renamed Penlee to make way for a replacement Sir Richard Grenville then moved on to the Dover Harbour Board where she was renamed a second time to Lady Savile.

She was purchased by the Essex Yacht Club in 1947 as their Clubship and moved to Leigh-on-Sea in Essex. She was replaced in 1976 by the Trinity House Pilot cutter Bembridge and was broken up at Queenborough, Sheppey.

References

1891 ships
Passenger ships of the United Kingdom
Steamships of the United Kingdom
Ships built on the River Mersey
Ships of the Great Western Railway